The Yosemite Trail is a 1922 American silent Western film directed by Bernard J. Durning and starring Dustin Farnum, Irene Rich and Walter McGrail.

Cast
 Dustin Farnum as Jim Thorpe
 Irene Rich as Eve Marsham
 Walter McGrail as Ned Thorpe
 Frank Campeau as Jerry Smallbones
 William J. Ferguson as Peter Blunt 
 Charles K. French as The Sheriff

References

Bibliography
 Solomon, Aubrey. The Fox Film Corporation, 1915-1935: A History and Filmography. McFarland, 2011.

External links
 

1922 films
1922 Western (genre) films
1920s English-language films
American black-and-white films
Films directed by Bernard Durning
Fox Film films
Silent American Western (genre) films
1920s American films